Kotten is a hamlet in the municipality of Winterswijk, in the Netherlands.

It was first mentioned in 1302 as Katen or Koten, and means "little farms/houses".

Kotten was home to 677 people in 1840. Kotten always had good relations with neighbouring  in Germany and both villages used to known for their smuggling activities.

Notable people 
  (born 1992), model and television presenter. Miss World Nederland in 1998.

Gallery

References

Populated places in Gelderland
Winterswijk